Porro is one of the many valleys that seat on the floor of the Great Rift Valley in Kenya.

During the short rains, Porro Valley transforms the Great Northern Wilderness into a green expanse of cedar trees

References 

Villages in Kenya
Cities in the Great Rift Valley